J. W. Walker & Sons Ltd is a British firm of organ builders established in 1828 by Joseph William Walker in London. Walker organs were popular additions to churches during the Gothic Revival era of church building and restoration in Victorian Britain, and instruments built by Walker are found in many churches around the UK and in other countries. The firm continues to build organs today.

History

Joseph William Walker
The firm was founded by Joseph William Walker (1802–1870), an apprentice to George Pike England. Walker established his own organ-building business in Soho, London in 1828, and moved later to Francis Street off Tottenham Court Road.

Notable initially for pleasing small church and barrel organs, Walker achieved a breakthrough with the order for a large three-manual instrument at Romsey Abbey, Hampshire in 1858, including a thirty-two foot Pedal Open Wood. This instrument was in 2007 substantially in its original state, a recent renovation confirming its outstanding musical qualities.

Walker died in 1870, and his youngest and only surviving son, James John Walker, took over the firm.

James John Walker
Arguably, the heyday of the company occurred towards the end of the nineteenth century under the leadership of James John Walker (1846–1922), the youngest and only surviving son of Joseph William. The company developed a reputation in the 1890s for excellence in massive diapason voicing using scales and pressures for flue work greater than those used by Hill or Willis. The effect was rolling and magnificent. Notable instruments included those in London at Holy Trinity Sloane Street and St Margaret's Westminster; cathedrals at York, Rochester, and Bristol; and the organs at St Mary's, Portsea and St Matthew's, Northampton. Walker also later rebuilt the Gray & Davison concert organ at the Crystal Palace, increasing its power to carry across the vast space of the central transept. The sequence of church instruments continued into the twentieth century, including the large instrument at the Roman Catholic church of The Sacred Heart, Wimbledon, built in 1912.

After James Walker's death, the reputation of the firm in the "first division" of British organ building lasted through the Second World War. By the 1960s, British organ design had become not only eclectic but, to some ears, meekly derivative.  The rebuild at Wimborne Minster in 1965 incorporated pipework from earlier periods beginning in 1664; the old material was made to sit with elements in vogue at the time of the Walker rebuild to create an organ whose character could be said to be either of all its history or properly representative of none of it, except perhaps 1965 itself. Later commentators have levelled harsh words at the 1960s "Jack-of-all-trades" British pipe organ without realizing that for the players of the day, such innovations drawn from European practice entirely outside the original scheme and character of the instruments, did at least open new avenues for players just getting used to attempt, for example, baroque performance practice.

Given enough money, the Walker firm could produce impressive, cogent and exciting new work, as at Liverpool's new Catholic cathedral (1967–68). The instrument could be seen as a response to the existing (and outstanding) instrument by Henry Willis III at the neighbouring Anglican cathedral, and recordings by several outstanding European players, including Jeanne Demessieux and Flor Peeters, were made there.

Robert Pennells and the move to Brandon
Eventually, a recognizable revival came to the Walker firm with its move, in stages, from west London to the small town of Brandon, on the Suffolk/Norfolk border, where the organ building firm and a parts supply business ("P & S") occupied  modern workshops. In the 1980s, under the leadership of Robert Pennells, his German (Klais)-trained son Andrew, B. Q. S. F. Buchanan and head voicer Michael Butler, a number of new and prestigious instruments were made, including town hall organs at Bolton in 1985 (after a fire four years before which destroyed a famous 1874 Gray & Davison instrument) and, leading a group of instruments for export, at Adelaide (1989); at Lancing College Chapel in 1986–7; and several years later at London's St Martin-in-the-Fields. The visual effect of a number of the new instruments benefited considerably from the case-designs of David Graebe. Later organs included a Cavaillé-Coll-inspired instrument, built in 1995 at Exeter College, Oxford.

In 1999, Andrew Pennells died, drawing his father out of retirement. Today, the business has four distinct parts under the umbrella of "The Walker Group": restoration work operating from premises in the Wiltshire town of Devizes; tuning, supplies to the trade and a small new-organbuilding practice in Brandon.

List of works

Walker's work at Waltham Abbey
Maintenance of the organ at Waltham Abbey, installed in 1819 by Flight & Robson, was taken over by J. W. Walker in 1850. The company carried out a number of additions and reconstructions to it between then and 1953, including installing a replacement in 1879. In 1953 they "completely dismantled and rebuilt" it and resited the console at a cost of "under £7,000." Since 2003, this organ has been in the care of Harrison & Harrison of Durham. An appeal was launched in 2007 to raise £250,000 for a replacement organ.

The organ removed in 1879 could be the "fine Walker organ" said to have come from Waltham Abbey and to have made "an absolutely splendid sound". This instrument was installed at Little Clacton, Essex in 1939, and later sold on to Christ Church, Greenwich.

References

External links

 J. W. Walker & Sons website
 Portsmouth & District Organists Association

Pipe organ building companies
Organ builders of the United Kingdom
1828 establishments in England
Musical instrument manufacturing companies of the United Kingdom